Fereshteh/ Fereshtah (also transliterated as Freshteh or Ferishteh or Freshta,  fereshteh / fereshtah ) is a feminine given name of Persian origin meaning angel, one of the most popular names in the Persian-speaking world.

The etymology of the word is traced to Sanskrit preṣyatā प्रेष्यता and Avestan fraēšta-, messenger which led to  Persian فرشته • ferešte.

For phonological reasons, it is usually transcribed as Fereshtah or Freshta in the Persian spoken in Afghanistan and Tajikistan.

Brief history of Fereshteh street 

In the early 1320s (1940 AD), Mr Mohammad Ali Masoudi, a journalist, publisher, member of parliament (Majles) and finally a senator in the Iranian Senate, Mr Masoudi built a summer house with a large garden on a dirt road named Doctor Namdar, which was off ValiAsr (Pahlavi) and went by the name of Doctor Namdar.

Mr. Masoudi had two daughters, Maryam and Fereshteh and he changed part of the street name to Fereshteh and after the revolution the remainder of Doctor Namdar street was changed to Koohyar.

People
Firishta (1560-1620), (male) Persian historian
Fereshteh Jenabi (1948-1998), Iranian actress
Fereshta Kazemi (born 1979), Afghan–American film actress
Fereshteh Ghazi, Iranian journalist
Fereshteh Molavi (born 1953), Iranian-Canadian fiction writer and essayist
Fereshteh Sadre Orafaee (born 1962), Iranian actress
Fereshteh Taerpour  (born 1953), Iranian film producer
Fereshteh Forough  Afghan computer scientist
Freshta Kohistani, Afghan rights activist

Places
Fereshteh Jan, village in Juyom Rural District, Juyom District, Larestan County, Fars Province, Iran

Film
Farishta (1958 film)

Notes

Persian feminine given names